Carlos Ruesga (born 10 March 1985) is a Spanish handball player for Sporting CP and the Spanish national team.

References

1985 births
Living people
Spanish male handball players
Sporting CP handball players
Real Grupo de Cultura Covadonga sportsmen
Sportspeople from Gijón